The White House Office of Intergovernmental Affairs (IGA) is a unit of the White House Office, within the Executive Office of the President. It serves as the primary liaison between the White House and state, county (or county-equivalent), local, and tribal governments. The office focuses on building new and maintaining current relationships with governors, tribal leaders, mayors, state legislators, and county executives. The Office of Intergovernmental Affairs works with federal agencies and departments to ensure appropriate coordination between state, local, and tribal governments and the federal government.  The Director of Intergovernmental Affairs at the White House Office for the Biden administration is Julie Chavez Rodriguez.

Origin
The Office of Intergovernmental Affairs was established in 1955 by President Dwight D. Eisenhower when he appointed former Arizona Governor John Howard Pyle as Special Assistant to the President for Intergovernmental Affairs.  The appointment followed the recommendations of the Kestnbaum Commission on Intergovernmental Relations, which had been established by Congress to study problems in the interactions between federal and state governments.

List of Directors of Intergovernmental Affairs

Gwendolyn King (1986–1988)
Mickey Ibarra
Janet Creighton (2008–2009)
Cecilia Muñoz (2009–2012)
David Agnew (2012–2014)
Jerry Abramson (2014–2017)
Justin R. Clark (2017–2018)
Douglas Hoelscher (2018–2021)
Julie Rodriguez (2021–present)

References

External links 
 Official website from the presidency of Barack Obama

Executive Office of the President of the United States
Intergovernmental Affairs
Presidency of the United States